The 1936–37 season was the 38th season for FC Barcelona.

Results 

1 The match was postponed on 30.05.1937

External links

webdelcule.com
webdelcule.com

References

FC Barcelona seasons
Barcelona